Prospect Hill may refer to:

Australia
 Prospect Hill (New South Wales), a hill in Western Sydney, New South Wales
Prospect Hill Reservoir, a water tower
Prospect Hill, South Australia, a small town in the southern Adelaide Hills

Canada
 Prospect Hill, Sudbury District, Ontario, a township in Ontario

China
 Jingshan in Beijing, north of the Forbidden City

United States

Buildings
 Prospect Hill (Long Green, Maryland), a house
 Prospect Hill (Charleston County, South Carolina), a house
 Prospect Hill (Arlington, Virginia), a former mansion that is a historic district
 Prospect Hill (Fincastle, Virginia), a house
 Prospect Hill (Fredericksburg, Virginia), a house
 Prospect Hill (Middlesex County, Virginia), home of John A. G. Davis
 Prospect Hill (Spotsylvania County, Virginia), a plantation house in Spotsylvania County, Virginia

Historic districts
 Prospect Hill, Cincinnati, Ohio
 Prospect Hill Historic District (New Haven, Connecticut)
 Prospect Hill Historic District (Willimantic, Connecticut)
 Prospect Hill Historic District (Bloomington, Indiana)
 Prospect Hill Historic District (Janesville, Wisconsin), on the National Register of Historic Places listings in Rock County, Wisconsin
 Prospect Hill Historic District (Milwaukee, Wisconsin), on the National Register of Historic Places listings in Milwaukee

Inhabited places
 Prospect Hill, Cincinnati, a historic neighborhood
 Prospect Hill, a neighborhood in Brookfield, Connecticut
 Prospect Hill, New Haven, a neighborhood of New Haven, Connecticut
 Prospect Hill, Omaha, a neighborhood of North Omaha, Nebraska
 Prospect Hill, New York, a town in Orange County, New York
 Prospect Hill, North Carolina, a community
 Prospect Hill, Tacoma, Washington, a neighborhood

Natural formations
 Prospect Hill, a bluff outside Manhattan, Kansas
 Prospect Hill (Barnstable County, Massachusetts), a mountain in Barnstable County, Massachusetts
 Prospect Hill (Massachusetts), a mountain in Dukes County, Massachusetts
 Prospect Hill, Waltham, Massachusetts, a hill
 Prospect Hill, an historic hill in Somerville, Massachusetts – see Union Square
 Prospect Hill (Augusta, New York), an elevation in Oneida County, New York
 Prospect Hill (Delaware County, New York), a mountain located in the Catskill Mountains of New York
 Prospect Hill (Greene County, New York), an elevation in Greene County, New York
 Prospect Hill (Kirkland, New York), an elevation in Oneida County, New York
 Prospect Hill (Otsego County, New York), an elevation in Otsego County, New York
 Prospect Hill (Ulster County, New York), a mountain in the Catskill Mountains of New York

Other places in the United States
 Prospect Hill (B&M station), Somerville, Massachusetts
 Prospect Hill Cemetery (North Omaha, Nebraska)

See also
Prospect Hill Academy Charter School, Cambridge, Massachusetts
Prospect Hill Historic District (disambiguation)
Prospect Hill Cemetery (disambiguation)